Euphilotes mojave, known generally as the Mojave dotted blue or Mojave blue, is a species of blue in the butterfly family Lycaenidae. It is found in North America.

The MONA or Hodges number for Euphilotes mojave is 4367.1.

Subspecies
These two subspecies belong to the species Euphilotes mojave:
 Euphilotes mojave mojave (F. Watson & W. Comstock, 1920)
 Euphilotes mojave virginensis Austin in T. Emmel, 1998

References

Further reading

 

Euphilotes
Articles created by Qbugbot